Zgornja Selnica is a settlement immediately north of Selnica ob Dravi in northeastern Slovenia.

References

External links
Zgornja Selnica on Geopedia

Populated places in the Municipality of Selnica ob Dravi